False Round Point is a point  west of North Foreland and  south of Ridley Island, on the north coast of King George Island in the South Shetland Islands of Antarctica. The point has appeared on charts since about 1822.

Important Bird Area
A 125 ha tract of ice-free land, including the headland, has been identified as an Important Bird Area (IBA) by BirdLife International because it supports a large breeding colony of about 50,000 pairs of chinstrap penguins.

References 

Headlands of King George Island (South Shetland Islands)
Important Bird Areas of Antarctica
Penguin colonies